Adam William Finch (born 28 May 2000) is an English cricketer. He made his first-class debut on 10 June 2019, for Worcestershire in the 2019 County Championship. Prior to his first-class debut, he was named in England's squad for the 2018 Under-19 Cricket World Cup. He made his Twenty20 debut on 3 September 2020, for Worcestershire in the 2020 t20 Blast. He made his List A debut on 25 July 2021, for Worcestershire in the 2021 Royal London One-Day Cup.

References

External links
 

2000 births
Living people
English cricketers
Worcestershire cricketers
Surrey cricketers
People from Wordsley
English cricketers of the 21st century